Charlotte Brent (17 December 1734 – 10 April 1802) was a child prodigy and celebrated soprano singer of the 18th century.

Life
She was the daughter of Catherine and Charles Brent (1693–1770). He was a Handelian counter-tenor, and fencing-master. She was a pupil and mistress of Thomas Arne (the composer of Rule, Britannia!) and later the wife of the violinist Thomas Pinto (whom she married in 1766).

She was an active performer in London from 1758-1769, and in 1759 she appeared to great success in The Beggar's Opera at Vauxhall Gardens. The following year she appeared again at Vauxhall alongside Isabella Vincent which invited comparison in the press. Brent was noted at the time for her bravura singing and her neat, distinct, and rapid execution.

Brent was the step grandmother of the composer and keyboard virtuoso George Pinto. Brent had a long musical partnership with Arne, often appearing in his opera productions and performing his works in concerts. Among the roles she originated were Mandane in Arne's Artaxerxes, Sally in Arne's Thomas and Sally, and Rosetta in Arne's Love in a Village.

Brent is said to have died in obscurity on 10 April 1802.

References

External links
Thomas Augustine Arne
Thomas Arne's Artaxerxes

1735 births
1802 deaths
18th-century British women opera singers
English sopranos